Tethystola unifasciata is a species of beetle in the family Cerambycidae. It was described by Galileo and Martins in 2001. It is known from Peru.

References

Apomecynini
Beetles described in 2001